The Astana Club is a global issues dialogue platform based on Chatham House rules and convened by Nursultan Nazarbayev.  

The club has partnered with international think tanks the Institute of World Economy and Politics, the Carnegie Endowment, the German Council on Foreign Relations, the China Institute of Contemporary International Relations, and the Russian International Affairs Council.  

Club participants include scholars, businesspersons and former members of the U.S. Congress.  

The Astana Club inaugural meeting was keynoted by OSCE PA Secretary General Spencer Oliver.

References

Nursultan Nazarbayev
Government of Kazakhstan